Ireland In Music is a TV programme first broadcast on RTÉ One Television on December 29, 2020, featuring a number of Irish-based musicians performing in locations around Ireland.

Background 
The show was produced by Temple Bar TradFest in association with Born Optimistic, The Temple Bar Company, RTÉ, the Department of Tourism, Culture, Arts, Gaeltacht, Sport and Media, Fáilte Ireland, Tourism Ireland and the local authorities of Co Clare, Co Donegal, Co Dublin, Fingal, Co Meath and Co Westmeath. It was directed by Donal Scannell and filmed under degrees of COVID-19 lockdown. The artists taking part performed a mixture of traditional Irish folk songs and original material. First broadcast on RTÉ One Television on December 29, 2020  the programme was repeated on August 8, 2021. Internationally it was broadcast on 19 TV stations across 41 countries.

Reception 
The programme was received part of a wider trend of streamed and recorded performance due to COVID-19 restrictions. Writing in the Irish Examiner, Simon Price noted "the shift from live concerts to online streaming brought about by the pandemic has given audiences and artists an opportunity to enjoy high-quality original Irish music presented from national parks, stately homes, art galleries, iconic landmarks and other venues not ordinarily open to public performance...the crowning effort of this trend to date has been the production of Ireland In Music, broadcast on RTÉ television over the Christmas period.". He did, however, consider "it was unfortunate that no space was found for artists and destinations north of border".  Regionally, the use of locations in Co Clare was welcomed by the likes of The Mayor of Clare, Cllr Mary Howard.

Related Projects 

In 2021 Temple Bar TradFest presented TradFest@Home, five nights of live music streamed from the state rooms at Dublin Castle.

Performances

References 

RTÉ original programming
2020 television specials
COVID-19 pandemic in Ireland
Irish music